Raphana (Ραφάνα in Ancient greek), in present-day north of Jordan, was a city of the Decapolis. It is thought to lie north of Umm Qais in the Abilene plain. It is usually identified with Abila, a site in northern Jordan; i.e., Raphana is the Roman phase of Abila.

For a time the city was the base camp of the Roman legion Legio XII Fulminata.

References
Decapolis tour reference

External links

Populated places in Irbid Governorate
Decapolis
Roman towns and cities in Jordan
Former populated places in Southwest Asia
Roman fortifications in Arabia Petraea